King Wei of Chu (died 329 BC) was the king of the state of Chu from 339 to 329 BC, during the Warring States period of ancient China.  He was born Xiong Shang and King Wei was his posthumous title.

King Wei succeeded his father King Xuan of Chu, who died in 340 BC.  King Wei died in 329 BC after an eleven-year reign and was succeeded by his son King Huai of Chu.

In fiction and popular culture
 Portrayed by Winston Chao in The Legend of Mi Yue (2015)

References

Monarchs of Chu (state)
Chinese kings
4th-century BC Chinese monarchs
329 BC deaths
Year of birth unknown